Blake Ashley Ricciuto Harriot (born 2 September 1992) is an Australian footballer who plays as a midfielder. Ricciuto was born in Sydney, Australia. He currently plays in the Singapore Premier League with club Tanjong Pagar United. He is of Uruguayan and Italian descent and speaks both English and Spanish fluently.

Career

St George FC 
At the age of 15 Ricciuto made his debut for St George FC who played in which was then called the NSW Super League. He was a key part of the club for the 3 years he was there where he played in the 2010 Grand Final.

Danubio FC 
Ricciuto went to try his luck in his fathers place of birth of Uruguay at the age of 19. He was lucky enough to get a trial with Danubio FC Reserves, which then consisted of current Atlético Madrid centre back José María Gimenez, he impressed on his trial and the club offered him a contract but 3 days later due to a dispute between the Agent that recommended Ricciuto and the head of football. Blake was left without a club.

Club Atlético Peñarol 
Ricciuto went on trial to his and his family's childhood club of Peñarol after not sealing a deal with Danubio, he was in trial for over 3 months until Uruguayan and Juventus legend Paolo Montero took over as a manager of the reserves and decided to sign the Australian/ Uruguayan midfielder. This team consisted of the likes of current Cagliari and Uruguay national team player Nahitan Nandez. On Ricciuto’s second start for the reserves during the curtain raiser for first grade at Estadio Jardines del Hipódromo he scored a 94th minute winner against Danubio FC. After this goal and several good performances he started to train regularly with first grade. Unfortunately he couldn’t crack the first team and he decided to go to second division side Canadian Soccer Club.

Canadian S.C 
Ricciuto was a key part in Canadian Soccer Club historic run to the play off finals, he played 27 games in Uruguayan Segunda Division where they lost in the play off final to get promoted to Uruguayan Primera Division which is Uruguays top tier.

Rockdale City FC 
After an unsuccessful trial with Sydney FC following his stint in Uruguay even though impressing in a trial match against Belconnen Ricciuto signed at Rockdale City Suns FC where he became a household name and a cult hero because of his David Luiz like hair. The 3 years at the club he was named player of the year twice and also team of the year of the NPL twice as well. He was a stand out performer in the FFA CUP game against Sydney FC. He was very unfortunate to not be snapped up by an A league side.

Brunei DPMM 
After having a great season with Rockdale City FC Ricciuto attended a trial at Brunei DPMM FC and was signed by the club for the 2019 season. He played a major role in the Bruneian club's title-winning season as a starter, scoring nine goals from midfield. He was named in the Singapore Premier League and Straits times Team of the Year and received Player of the Month and Goal of the month award for April. After leaving DPMM, he was poised to move to Vélez CF in Spain, but due to administration delays in his native Australia he was not registered in time for the start of the season.

Tanjong Pagar FC 
After the Vélez CF deal fell through Ricciuto signed with Singapore Premier League club Tanjong Pagar United until the end of the season.

Ricciuto got off to a great start with Tanjong Pagar scoring on his debut for the club against Geylang in the opening 2021 fixture in round 1. He went to score another goal that season against Young Lions and finishing the season as the clubs leading assist taker with 6 assists next to his name. 

After the 2021 season Ricciuto announced that he wouldn't be returning to Tanjong Pagar in search of a different challenge. He mentioned in a podcast that he had agreed to a deal at Indonesian club Persik Kediri but prior to travelling to Indonesia he contracted COVID and the club wasn't able to go ahead with the deal. With this happening Ricciuto announce his return to Tanjong Pagar as the last foreign signing for 2022, he once again got off to a great start by starting round 1 with a Man of the Match performance with future champions Albirex Nigata leading them to a 2-0 victory, He later went on to have a standout season finishing the season as second leading goalscorer for the club with 7 goals with 5 of those goals coming in 5 consecutive games.

He has been announced to return for a third straight year at Tanjong Pagar as one of their key players.

Career statistics

Notes

Honours
Brunei DPMM FC
Singapore Premier League 2019 Champion.
Singapore Premier League 2019 Team of the year. 
Singapore Premier League 2019 Player of the month for April.
Singapore Premier League 2019 Goal of the month for April.
 DPMM FC Player of the year 2019.

Rockdale City FC
National Premier Leagues NSW 2018 Team of the year.
National Premier Leagues NSW 2016 Team of the year.
Rockdale City Suns FC 2016 & 2017 Player of the year.

References

External links

1992 births
Living people
Association football midfielders
Australian soccer players
Australian expatriate soccer players
Australian expatriate sportspeople in Spain
Australian people of Uruguayan descent
Sportspeople of Uruguayan descent
Australian people of Italian descent
Peñarol players
DPMM FC players
Tanjong Pagar United FC players
Expatriate footballers in Brunei
Expatriate footballers in Singapore
Expatriate footballers in Spain
National Premier Leagues players
Rockdale Ilinden FC players